Terrance Hillbert Lyons (December 14, 1908 – September 9, 1959) was a Major League Baseball first baseman. Lyons played in one game for the Philadelphia Phillies on April 19, coming into the game as a Defensive substitution.

External links 

1908 births
1959 deaths
Philadelphia Phillies players
Major League Baseball first basemen
Baseball players from Ohio
People from New Holland, Ohio